Smoke discharger may refer to:
 Smoke grenade discharger, or commonly a cluster of smoke grenade launchers
 A smoke machine used by the T-62 tank